Vianu is a Romanian surname:

 
 Ion Vianu
 
 
 Victor Vianu, computer scientist
 Tudor Vianu (1898–1964), literary critic, art critic, poet, philosopher
 Tudor Vianu National College of Computer Science

Romanian-language surnames